William Joseph Waters  (September 19, 1947 – February 18, 2008) was an American country music singer. He released at least five singles that charted on the U.S. Billboard Hot Country Singles chart. He released one album, Harvest Moon in 1983.

Discography

Studio albums

Singles

References

American country singer-songwriters
American male singer-songwriters
1947 births
2008 deaths
Singer-songwriters from Ohio
20th-century American singers
Country musicians from Ohio
20th-century American male singers